Samuel Avital is a mime artist. He has also taught kinesthetic awareness and Kabbalah.

He was born in Sefrou, near Fez in the Atlas Mountains in Morocco. He moved to a kibbutz in Israel when he was fourteen. From 1958 he studied dance and drama at the Sorbonne in Paris, and also mime under Étienne Decroux, Marcel Marceau and Jean-Louis Barrault.

He moved to the United States, and in 1971 started a school of mime, Le Centre du Silence, in Boulder, Colorado, where an annual international summer mime workshop was held.

Books 

Avital has published books including:

 Le Centre Du Silence Mime Work Book, Venice, California: Wisdom Garden Books, 1975 (translated into German as Mimenspiel: die Kunst der Körpersprache, 1985)
 Mime and Beyond: The Silent Outcry, Prescott Valley, Arizona: Hohm Press, 1985
 The Conception Mandala: Creative Techniques for Inviting a Child into Your Life (with Mark Olsen), Rochester, Vermont: Destiny Books, 1992

References 

1932 births
Living people
University of Paris alumni
Moroccan Jews
Southern Methodist University faculty
Kabbalists
French mimes
Jewish mimes
Moroccan mimes
Moroccan expatriates in France
Moroccan expatriates in the United States
Moroccan expatriates in Israel